The Lamborghini Countach LPI 800-4 is a mid-engine hybrid-electric sports car produced by the Italian automotive manufacturer Lamborghini. Unveiled on 14 August 2021, the car is named after the original Countach which was first introduced 50 years prior. Based on the hybridized powertrain of the Sián FKP 37, 112 units are planned to be produced, the number referring to the LP 112 model designation used during development of the original Countach.

All 112 units had been sold less than a week after the model was unveiled. Customer deliveries commenced in early 2022.

Specifications and performance 

The Countach LPI 800-4 shares its underpinnings and mechanicals with the Sián FKP 37 which was unveiled in 2019. It utilizes the same carbon-fiber monocoque along with the same mild hybrid powertrain with a slightly decreased combined output of  powering all four wheels. It is a combination of the longitudinally positioned (LP) naturally-aspirated 6.5-liter V12 engine which in this case produces , along with a 48-volt electric motor producing an additional  which is located inside the 7-speed automated manual transmission. Energy from the regenerative braking system is stored in a supercapacitor which is lighter than a traditional lithium-ion battery.

References

External links 

 Official website

Countach LPI 800-4
Cars introduced in 2021
Sports cars
Coupés
Rear mid-engine, all-wheel-drive vehicles
Hybrid electric vehicles
Retro-style automobiles